Abacetus mirei is a species of ground beetle in the subfamily Pterostichinae. It was described by Straneo in 1964.

References

mirei
Beetles described in 1964